French Mexicans (or ) are Mexican citizens of full or partial French ancestry. French nationals make up the second largest European immigrant group in Mexico, after Spaniards.

Migration history
The first wave of French immigration to Mexico occurred in the 1830s, following the country's recognition by France, with the foundation of a French colony on the Coatzacoalcos River, in the state of Veracruz. In total, 668 settlers were brought from France to populate the colony. Most of them went back to France as the project of colonization failed, but some permanently settled in Mexico. In 1833, another colony was founded in the state of Veracruz as well, under the name of Jicaltepec. A second wave of French immigration came to Mexico at the end of the 1840s, during the California Gold Rush (at the time gold was discovered, California was still part of the Mexican territory). As a consequence, in 1849 French represented the second foreign community in Mexico after Spaniards. Between 1850 and 1914, Mexico received 60,000 to 300,000 French immigrants.  . 

According to the 2010 Census, French people form the second largest European emigrant community in Mexico after Spaniards, and eleventh overall immigrant community. There are around 9,500 French nationals registered in Mexico and about 6,000 to 7,000 Frenchmen unregistered. Two thirds of them are Mexicans of French ancestry holding double nationality. Many Mexicans of French descent live in cities and states such as Zacatecas, San Luis Potosí, Aguascalientes, Veracruz, Guanajuato, Jalisco, Puebla, Queretaro and Mexico City.

Second Mexican Empire 

Most French Mexicans descend from immigrants and soldiers that settled in Mexico during the Second Mexican Empire, headed by Maximilian I of Mexico and masterminded by Emperor Napoleon III of France and the Mexican conservatives in the 1850’s to create a Latin empire in the New World (indeed responsible for coining the term or Amérique latine, or 'Latin America'). Emperor Maximilian's consort, Carlota of Mexico, a princess of Belgium, was a granddaughter of Louis-Philippe of France.

The "Barcelonnettes" 

The largest wave of immigration from France to Mexico came from the city of Barcelonnette, in Alpes-de-Haute-Provence. Between 1850 and 1950, 5,000 to 6,000 inhabitants of the Ubaye Valley immigrated to Mexico. Many established textile businesses between Mexico and France. While 90% stayed in Mexico, some returned to Barcelonette, and from 1880 to 1930, built grand mansions called Maisons Mexicaines and left a mark upon the city. Today, there are 60,000 descendants of the "Barcelonnettes".

French settlement in Veracruz 

In 1833, 98 persons coming from Haute-Saône, Haute-Marne, Côte-d'Or and Yonne settled in a colony called Jicaltepec, in the state of Veracruz. In 1874, the community resettled on the other bank of the river, in San Rafael. From 1880 to 1900 the population of the colony grew from 800 to 1,000 inhabitants. There are now around 10,000 French Mexicans in the state of Veracruz.

Involvement in World War II 
Jean René Champion, a Mexican of French ancestry, was the first Free French Forces (Forces Françaises Libres) officer to enter Paris on the day when the city was liberated from the Nazis on August 26, 1944.

French contributions to Mexican society 
1.The French introduced cultural traits adopted by the Mexican culture and may have helped coin the term “Mariachi”, though it is not certain. The word “Mariachi” may have originated during French Napoleonic rule in the 1860s since French settler families used the music during weddings (marriage). Clark attributes this to "phonetic coincidence" (Clark, 1996).  An important culinary contribution was the bolillo, which is now widely used for the torta. The French also heavily influenced Mexico's pan dulce.
2.Goldbud

Education
There are two French international schools in Mexico:
 Lycée Franco-Mexicain (campuses in Mexico City and Cuernavaca)
 Lycée Français de Guadalajara

Notable French-Mexicans

 Luis G. Abbadie, writer
 León Aillaud, governor of Veracruz
 Miirrha Alhambra, French-born Mexican pianist
 Pita Amor, poet, of French descent
 Ramón Arnaud, Mexican Army and the last Mexican governor of Clipperton Island; of French descent
 Aracely Arámbula, Mexican actress, model, and singer; of French and Basque descent
 Alberto Baillères, third-richest man in Mexico
 Jean-Louis Berlandier, scientist 
 Angelique Boyer, Mexican, French-born telenovela actress
 Linda Christian, movie actress, of French descent
 Manuel Clouthier, businessman and politician
 Tatiana Clouthier, politician, writer, and entrepreneur
 Carlos Loret de Mola, Mexican journalist of French descent
 Edgar de Evia, Mexican-born American photographer
 Eugenio Derbez, actor, comedian, and film director; of French descent on his great grandmother's side (Gilly)
 Consuelo Duval, Mexican actress of French descent
 Yolanda Vargas Dulché, writer, mother of French origin
 Roberto Heinze Flamand, sprint canoeist, of French descent
 Eugène Goupil, French-born Mexican philanthropist and collector
 Francisco Romano Guillemin, artist, of French descent
 Ralph Heinze,  sprint canoeist, of French descent
 Claude Heller, ambassador, of German and French descent
 Saturnino Herrán, painter
 Lourdes Grobet, photographer
 Gustavo Huet, Mexican-born American athlete, of French descent
 Emilio Azcárraga Jean, businessman, of French descent
 Frédéric-Yves Jeannet, French-born Mexican writer and professor
 Elizabeth Katz, actress and former model, of French descent
 Michelito Lagravere, child bullfighter, to French father
 Remigio Leroy, French-born doctor and first Guanajuato mummy
 Alberto Ruz Lhuillier, French-born Mexican archaeologist
 Ángel Navarro, French-born leading Spanish settler in New Spain
 Montserrat Olivier, actress, television presenter, and former fashion model
 Roberto Palazuelos, actor, mother of French origin
 Elena Poniatowska, French-born Mexican journalist and author; French and Mexican noble descent
 Antonio Enríquez Savignac, politician
 Laurette Séjourné, Italian-born Mexican archaeologist and ethnologist, of French descent
 Eugenio Toussaint, composer, arranger, and jazz musician
 Eduardo Troconis, race-car driver
 Adrián Woll, 19th-century Mexican general, born and died in France
 José Youshimatz, Mexican-born American, retired track cyclist and road bicycle racer; of French descent
 DJ Trevi, Mexican-American, DJ, producer, composer, and actor; of French descent

See also
France–Mexico relations
Mexicans in France
White Mexicans

References

External links
 Los que llegaron - Franceses from Canal Once

European Mexican
Immigration to Mexico
Mexico
 
Ethnic groups in Mexico